Vitomir "Vito" Nikolić (27 April 1934 – 10 September 1994) was a Yugoslav and Montenegrin poet and journalist from Nikšić. His work is often compared to that of Sergey Yesenin, as he is often dubbed as "Montenegrin Yesenin", as well "The Good Spirit of Nikšić".

Background
Originally from Nikšić, he was born in Mostar, Kingdom of Yugoslavia (now Bosnia and Herzegovina), where his father served in the army. In 1941, he returned to Nikšić with his family. After his father and brother had been killed in World War II, he lived in an orphanage until he turned 18. He spent most of his life in Nikšić, living in poverty, and was well known for his bohemian lifestyle.

Works
Vito published his first two books of poetry, "Drumovanja" (Journeys) and "Sunce, hladno mi je" (Sun, I'm feeling cold) without a publisher, hence paying for the costs of their production. Although he had some conflicts with socialist Yugoslav government, the government gave him a flat in Nikšić. Afterwards, he moved from Nikšić to Titograd, where he worked as a journalist for Pobjeda, writing short stories under the title "Crnom Gorom, putem i bespućem". Some of his poems for children became notable, and are included in the literature books for elementary and high school students. 

In 2002, some of Nikolić's prose writings were collected and published in a book "Dobri duh Nikšića" (The Good Spirit of Nikšić).

Legacy
Following his death, a "Vito Nikolić Award" for poetry has been established in Montenegro. The award is presented annually, during the "September days", a cultural manifestation hosted by the city of Nikšić.

In 2002, Montenegrin writer and journalist Đorđe Puśo Matović with whom Vito worked in Pobjeda, published a book of anecdotes from poet's life, titled "S Vitom na još po jednu" (Another round [of drinks] with Vito).

Published works
Drumovanja (1962)
Sunce, hladno mi je (1968)
Stihovi (1981)
Stare i nove pjesme (1991)
Posljednja pjesma (1994)
Nedjelja u gradu N (1997), published posthumously
Dobri duh Nikšića (2002), published posthumously

References

1934 births
1994 deaths
Writers from Nikšić
Montenegrin poets
Montenegrin male writers
Montenegrin children's writers
Yugoslav poets
20th-century poets
People from Mostar
People from Nikšić